Delhi Municipal Corporation (Amendment) Bill, 2022 is the legislation introduced and approved in Parliament of India and subsequently by President. The system of Municipal Corporation  was introduced in India during British Rule with formation of municipal corporation in Madras (Chennai) in 1688 followed by municipal corporations in Bombay (Mumbai) and Calcutta (Kolkata) by 1762. The system was followed later in other states by passing the respective Municipal Corporation Bill in each state to become law.

History 

Delhi Municipal Corporation (Amendment) Bill, 2022 was introduced and passed in Lok Sabha on 30th March and Rajya Sabha on 5th April. The system was aimed to ensure proper and optimum use of resources by effective planning. Currently the city has three corporations namely East Delhi Municipal Corporation (EDMC), North Delhi Municipal Corporation (NDMC), and South Delhi Municipal Corporation (SDMC) which were formed in year 2011.

Objective 

Delhi Municipal Corporation (Amendment) Bill, 2022 was planned for:

 Plans to give more autonomy to the body.

 Combines three separate municipal bodies into one.

 Helps in proper utilisation of resources across the city.

 Guides in proper planning of the city.

 Its possible to have uniform decision making body.

Delimitation exercise
Delhi Municipal Corporation (Amendment) Bill, 2022  proposed a reduction in the number of councillor seats to “not more than 250 seats” from the existing 272. A  three-member delimitation committee was constituted on July 8, 2022. It was required to complete the exercise and submit its report within four months from the date of its constitution. The committee is led by State Election Commissioner Vijay Dev. The average size of the ward would be around 65,000. Each assembly constituency shall be divided into a minimum of three wards and the principal of average population may not be maintained throughout, therefore a deviation to the extent of plus minus ten percent may be acceptable to the Union Government of India. The total population of the corporation (2011 census) shall be divided by the total number of wards and average population of each ward shall be obtained. The number of seats reserved for members of Scheduled Castes shall bear the same ratio to the total number of seats as the population of Scheduled Castes bears to the total population of Delhi. The Delimitation commission is using digitised maps of Geospatial Delhi Limited (GSDL).

Proposal 

Delhi Municipal Corporation (Amendment) Bill, 2022 proposes:

 Appointment of Special Officer by Central Government to discharge powers and functions of Corporations till Delhi Municipal Corporation is formed and its first meeting takes place.

 Centre through a notification in official Gazette to determine number of seats for councillors, reserved seats for members of Schedule Caste community,reserved seats rotation and geographical boundary of each merged ward.

Related Articles 

 Delhi Municipal Corporation

References

External links 
 www.example.com

Indian legislation
Parliament of India